Kevin Cunningham is an American boxing trainer who started the police boxing program in 1991, originally a police officer.

He is credited for bringing up boxing world champions Cory Spinks, Devon Alexander, David Diaz, and amateur boxing champion Stephen Shaw

Police career
Kevin Started his career in police in St. Louis Eighth District, ending his police career as narcotics detective.

Boxing trainer

Cory Spinks
Kevin's run with Cory Spinks started in 1995, winning championships in two weight classes (Welterweight and Super Welterweight), including the Undisputed Welterweight title vs Ricardo Mayorga in December 2003.

David Diaz
Kevin trained David Diaz going into his win vs established world champion Erik Morales.

Devon Alexander
Kevin started training Devon Alexander as a child, winning boxing championships in two divisions.

Stephen Shaw
Kevin helped train Shaw to win his second amateur championship in 2013. and started with him as an undefeated Heavyweight prospect in 2013.

References

Sportspeople from St. Louis
Living people
American boxing trainers
Year of birth missing (living people)